Sandwich : Double Trouble is a 2006 Indian Hindi-language comedy film starring Govinda in a dual role opposite Raveena Tandon and Mahima Chaudhry. The film is directed by Anees Bazmee. This film was completed in 2003 but was delayed for three years and finally released in 2006. The movie was remade in Kannada as Double Decker in 2011 starring Jaggesh. Earlier the title of movie was "Hum Do Hamara Ek". Due to delay in releasing the movie title was changed to "Sandwich", it received mixed reviews, who appreciated performance of Govinda, but it got criticised for writing, screenplay, cliched story and VFX, this film was a box office failure. It marked the last film of Shammi Kapoor before his death on 14 August 2011.

Plot

Sher Singh a.k.a. Shekhar (Govinda), a struggling movie scriptwriter, is in love with a temperamental Marathi girl Nisha (Raveena Tandon). then goes to swami trilokand he tells that soon he will marry two women. Sher Singh gets panic.However, Nisha's wealthy father arranges her marriage to his friend's son Vicky (Rajendranath Zutshi) who loves Nisha since a very long time. Sher Singh rushes home in response to a telegram to find that his marriage has been arranged with a local Village Punjabi girl, Sweetie (Mahima Chaudhry) who loves Him since Childhood . in return for his sister's marriage to Sweetie's brother. Since Sher's sister has physical disability in leg, this may be her only chance of finding a good husband. For his sister's sake, therefore, Sher marries Sweetie and returns to Mumbai.

Meanwhile, Nisha refuses to marry Vicky and is ready to kill herself. To pacify Nisha, her father forces Sher to marry her. Sher doesn't get a chance to explain about his first marriage. However, after the wedding, he confesses to Nisha's father that he is already married. Nisha's father advises Sher not to tell her anything. Meanwhile, Vicky goes crazy and attempts to kidnap Nisha as He want to marry Nisha . In the ensuing struggle, Nisha's father is killed, and then Vicky seemingly dies in an accident; so, Nisha never gets to learn the truth about Sher's bigamy.

7 years later 

Sher Singh leads a double life and has one son with each wife. The two sons, Tuktuk Shekhar  and Tony singh, are exact lookalikes. As the boys are admitted to the same school, they, as well as their mothers, become friends. Since Sher Singh goes by the name of  Shekhar while in Mumbai, he manages to convince his wives that there are two people—Sher Singh and Shekhar, the day Time he Spends with Sweetie and Night with Nisha . bearing a remarkable resemblance. His sons, meanwhile, suspect that something is wrong because of their similarities and keep investigating. When it almost seems like the truth will be out, there is a surprise element in the entry of a second Shekhar with exactly the same face, who claims to be Nisha's husband.

Now, Sher Singh can neither confess to being a bigamist nor sit silently, as a stranger stays with his wife Nisha. Meanwhile, he is implicated in a murder as well. Finally, it turns out that Vicky is not actually dead and he has undergone face reconstruction surgery to have the same face as Sher Singh.  Vicky Wants Nisha and try to Get close to Her but Sher Refuses it to happen, Vicky was About to Kill Sher and his family, except Nisha both Wife Fought for Him and saved him . After much slapstick, all ends well.

Cast
 Govinda in double role as Sher Singh, Sweety and Nisha's husband,Tony and Tuktuk's father
 Shekhar, Vicky Chopra (after plastic surgery ) whose face changed by Plastic Surgeon and pretends to be Shekhar 
 Mahima Chaudhry as  Sweety S. Singh,Sher Singh's first wife,Tony's mother,Tuktuk's stepmother, Nisha's rival
 Raveena Tandon as Nisha S. Singh, Sher Singh's second wife,TukTuk's mother,Tony's stepmother, Sweety's rival
 Satish Shah as Chelaramani
 Shweta Menon as Maggie, Shekhar's Servant
 Mushtaq Khan as Popatlal
 Sushil k sahu Bilaspur cg,
 Reema Lagoo as Mrs. Singh, Shekhar's Mother
 Kiran Kumar as Balbir Singh
 Mohnish Behl as Inspector Pange
 Anant Mahadevan as Mr. Rao
 Anang Desai as Plastic Surgeon
 Shammi Kapoor as Swami Trilokanand,A pandit who gives solutions to Sher Singh to tackle his problem,who also tells that soon he will marry two women at the same year.
 Shweta Menon as Dancer
 Rajendranath Zutshi as the real Vicky Chopra who wants to marry Nisha
 Sucheta Khanna as film actress

Music
Bahut Chalu Hai Saala - Sonu Nigam, Hema Sardesai, Govinda
Bangal Ka Rasgulla - Vinod Rathod, Jaspinder Narula
Bedhadak - Sudesh Bhosle, Jaspinder Narula
Ek Chumma De Do - Jaspinder Narula, Udit Narayan
Gabbroo - Alka Yagnik, Hema Sardesai
Hum Tum Hai Tanhai Hai - Sonu Nigam, Asha Bhosle
Sayonee - Sonu Kakkar, Sukwinder Singh
Zahreela Gussa - Sonu Nigam

References

External links

2000s Hindi-language films
2006 films
Films scored by Aadesh Shrivastava
Films scored by Sandeep Chowta
Films scored by Sukhwinder Singh
2006 comedy films
Indian comedy films
Films directed by Anees Bazmee
Hindi films remade in other languages
Hindi-language comedy films